The 2016 PBA D-League Aspirants Cup was the first conference of the 2015-16 PBA Developmental League season. It was opened on January 21, 2016 at the Filoil Flying V Center and competed by 9 teams and it was finished on April 14, 2016 where the Phoenix-FEU Accelerators defeated the Cafefrance Bakers-CEU in the best-of-5 finals showdown, 3 games to 2 and clinching their first ever title in their franchise.

Draft
The draft was conducted on December 1, 2015 at the PBA Cafe in Pasig. 215 hopefuls were applied in the draft for the chance to play in the league.

Draft Order:

First Round
1.) Jason Perkins (Racal/Keramix - DLSU)
2.) Julian Sargent (AMA University - DLSU)
3.) Von Pessumal (Tanduay Light - Ateneo)
4.) Taylor Statham (Cafe France)
5.) Avery Scharer (Wang's Basketball - Shoreline CC)
6.) Mike Williams (Mindanao Aguilas - Cal State U)
7.) Agustini Amar (Jam Liner - UP)
8.) Richard Escoto (Phoenix Petroleum - FEU)
9.) BDO-NU - Passed

Second Round
1.) Jordan Rios (Racal/Keramix - St. Clare)
2.) Ryan Pascual (AMA University - Cal State-Long Beach)
3.) Alfonso Gotladera (Tanduay Light - Ateneo)
4.) John Karl Casiño (Cafe France - CEU)
5.) Anton Castro (Wang's Basketball - Adamson)
6.) Taylor Wetherell (Mindanao Aguilas)
7.) Alfrancis Tamsi (Phoenix Petroleum - FEU)
8.) Jam Liner - Passed
9.) BDO-NU - Passed

Format
Conference format as it follows:

Teams will play in a single round-robin elimination round.
Top 8 teams will advance to the quarterfinals while the 9th placer team will be eliminated.
Top 4 teams will get a twice-to-beat quarterfinals incentive against lower-ranked teams to determine the semifinals placings. Semifinals is a best-of-three affair.
The two teams who won the semifinals matches will battle in a best-of-5 championship series.

Eliminations
The elimination round will run from January 21 to March 7, 2016. Games will be held in Filoil Flying V Arena, San Juan and Ynares Sports Arena, Pasig.

Team standings
Team standing at the end of the elimination round:

Schedule

Results

Bracket

BOLD- Series winner
In the quarterfinal round of Jam Liner and Tanduay, Tanduay wins the round, via 68-66 and 99-89; or 2 games to 0.

Quarterfinals

Semifinals 
This round is in a best-of-3 format. The winner advances to the finals.

CafeFrance vs. Tanduay series

Game 1

Game 2

Phoenix vs. Caida series

Game 1

Game 2

Finals

Game 1

Game 2

Game 3
 
With only 2.3 seconds left in the final frame and the Bakers leading by 2, 84-82, Roger Pogoy made a game-winning 3 pointer where it was assisted by Achie Inigo to close the gap to an inch for winning the 2016 PBA Aspirant's Cup title.

Game 4 
 
The Bakers led as much as 14, with a score of 82-68 in the final 6:47 of the game before the Mac Belo-led Phoenix-FEU drained down the lead to just a single point, 89-88 in the last 2:58 of the game. But Paul Zamar had answered the destruction to regain the six-point lead by the Bakers, 94-88 with 1:07 remaining.

Game 5 
 
Tolomia of the Phoenix-FEU started exchanging threes with Paul Zamar of the Cafefrance-CEU as the Accelerators clinch an 81-78 lead with 2:39 left, but Roger Pogoy joined the party by hitting his shot from the downtown to extend his team's lead to 6, 84-78 in the last 10 seconds before the 2-minute mark.

Awards
2016 PBA D-League Aspirant's Cup Champions: Phoenix-FEU Accelerators (1st title)

Runners-up: Cafefrance Bakers-CEU

Finals MVP: Mac Belo (19.6 points/game)

Tournament Most Valuable Player:Mac Belo

References

PBA D-League Aspirant's Cup
2016